The Roman Catholic Territorial Prelature of Klaipėda was a Roman Catholic territorial prelature which existed from 1926 to 1991 in the Lithuanian coastal area of Klaipėda (Lithuanian Klaipėdos kraštas). Klaipėda had, between 1328 and 1920, been part of East Prussia, a province of Prussia which itself was part of Germany from 1871 to 1945/1947, but after the First World War, it became part of the administration of the League of Nations. In 1923, Lithuania invaded the territory and annexed  it. As part of Lithuania, in 1926, the then four Catholic parishes were separated from the Diocese of Ermland (renamed Warmia in 1945), which it had been a part of since 1820. Since the area was small, and had few Catholic residents, it was not given a bishopric, but a territorial prelature. The prelature was vacant between 1939 and 1949 (when the Bishop of Ermland functioned as Apostolic Administrator), and after 1975.

In contrast to the rest of Lithuania, which is overwhelmingly Roman Catholic, the area of Klaipėda is, like much of East Prussia was until 1945, mostly Lutheran. In 1940, just 12,000 (7%) of the inhabitants were Catholic. By 1990, the number had doubled in all major cities due to migration (including moves and deportation after the Second World War) of the former populations, and immigration of Catholic Lithuanians.

After Lithuania's second independence in 1991, the territorial prelature was disestablished, and became part of Telšiai diocese.

Prelates and apostolic administrator
1926–1939: Justinas Staugaitis, prelate
1939–1949: sede vacante
1939–1947: Maximilian Kaller, apostolic administrator
1949–1966: Petras Maželis, prelate
1967–1975: Juozapas Pletkus, prelate
1975–1991: ?

Former dioceses in Europe
Catholic Church in Lithuania
Christian organizations established in 1926
Religious organizations disestablished in 1991
Roman Catholic dioceses and prelatures established in the 20th century
Territorial prelatures
1926 establishments in Lithuania
1991 disestablishments in Lithuania